Nogent–Le Perreux is a French railway station in Nogent-sur-Marne, Val-de-Marne. It is served by RER E.

Station
The station is at kilometric point 16.260 of the Paris-Est–Mulhouse-Ville railway. It opened as a RER station in 1999; it bears the name of Nogent-sur-Marne and Le Perreux-sur-Marne. It is served by RER E trains running on the E4 branch.

Service
The station is served in both directions by one train every 15 minutes off-peak, during peak times and at evening. More than 79 trains to Haussmann–Saint-Lazare and 78 trains to Villiers-sur-Marne and Tournan (at evening) call at the station.

Connections
Several buses stop near the station:

Future 
Nogent–Le Perreux could become, by 2030, a station of Grand Paris Express Métro Line 15, when the section from Rosny-Bois-Perrier to Champigny Centre is put into service.

See also 
 List of RER stations
 Paris-Est–Mulhouse-Ville railway
 RER E

References

External links
 

Réseau Express Régional stations
Railway stations in Val-de-Marne